Titta Keinänen (born 28 October 1993) is a Finnish karateka. She is a bronze medalist in the women's kumite +68 kg event at the 2019 European Games and the 2019 European Karate Championships.

In 2016, she won one of the bronze medals in her event at the World University Karate Championships held in Braga, Portugal.

She won one of the bronze medals in the women's kumite +68 kg event at the 2019 European Karate Championships held in Guadalajara, Spain. In that same year, she won one of the bronze medals in the women's kumite +68 kg event at the 2019 European Games held in Minsk, Belarus.

In June 2021, she competed at the World Olympic Qualification Tournament held in Paris, France hoping to qualify for the 2020 Summer Olympics in Tokyo, Japan. In November 2021, she competed in the women's +68 kg event at the World Karate Championships held in Dubai, United Arab Emirates. She was eliminated in her fourth match by eventual bronze medalist Sofya Berultseva of Kazakhstan.

She lost her bronze medal match in the women's +68 kg event at the 2022 World Games held in Birmingham, United States.

She competes at competitions of the Karate1 Premier League.

Achievements

References 

Living people
1993 births
Place of birth missing (living people)
Finnish female karateka
Karateka at the 2019 European Games
European Games medalists in karate
European Games bronze medalists for Finland
Competitors at the 2022 World Games
21st-century Finnish women